Michel Noher (born April 14, 1983) is an Argentine actor.

Biography
Michel is the son of the renowned French actor Jean Pierre Noher. He lived with his mother in Bariloche from the age of four to seventeen and then went to live in Buenos Aires, Argentina and began studying cinema and theater.

Personal life 
On April 22, 2016, it was announced that he was about to have a child with the actress Celeste Cid, news that surprised everyone since the couple had not made their relationship public until then. Antón was born on October 13, 2016.

Filmography

Movies

Television

Television Programs

Theater

Awards and nominations

References

External links
 

1983 births
Living people
Male actors from Buenos Aires
Argentine people of French-Jewish descent
Argentine male telenovela actors
Argentine male film actors
21st-century Argentine male actors
People from Bariloche